Giordaí Ua Laoghaire is an Irish songwriter and guitarist best known as a founding member of Nine Wassies From Bainne (formed 1992), who released the album Ciddy Hall in 1998. Born in Ovens, County Cork in the early 1960s, he has played with Five Go Down to the Sea? (1979–1980), Microdisney (mid-1980's) and Soon (late-1980's). The Wassies, formed in the early 1990s, were primarily an instrumental and live band, and recorded only a single album.

Musically diverse, Ua Laoghaire cites Rory Gallagher, Mahavishnu Orchestra, Planxty, Yes, Frank Zappa and punk rock as influences. His work has been described as "just too odd a proposition. Lyrically and musically, [his] songs overflowed with ideas. Bilingual, Ua Laoghaire’s lyrics switched between Irish and English as easily as the songs switched from easy-listening passages to disorienting rhythms."

References

Bibliography

External links
 Short film about Ua Laoghaire
Nine Wassies from Bainne live in Mountjoy Prison

20th-century Irish  male  singers
21st-century Irish  male singers
Alternative rock guitarists
Alternative rock singers
Five Go Down to the Sea? members
Living people
Microdisney members
Punk rock guitarists
Year of birth missing (living people)
People from County Cork